Harold Hughes Jenkins (17 November 1902 – 1981) was a Welsh footballer and minor counties cricketer.

Jenkins was born in Newport, Monmouthshire. He had a brief football career as an amateur for Newport County, signing in July 1924. He played in three matches in the 1924–25 Football League Third Division South, scoring one goal against Southend United. He was also an amateur cricketer for Monmouthshire, playing minor counties cricket for the county from 1923–1934, making 44 appearances in the Minor Counties Championship. He died at Derby towards the end of 1981.

References

1902 births
1981 deaths
Sportspeople from Newport, Wales
Footballers from Newport, Wales
Welsh footballers
English Football League players
Newport County A.F.C. players
Welsh cricketers
Monmouthshire cricketers
Association footballers not categorized by position